A Wild Hare is a 1940 American animated comedy short film directed by Tex Avery, produced by Leon Schlesinger, and distributed by Warner Bros. as part of the Merrie Melodies series. The film was released on July 27, 1940, and features Elmer Fudd and Bugs Bunny, the latter making what is considered his first official appearance.

Plot
The cartoon begins with Elmer tiptoeing around and telling the viewer his famous line, "Shh. Be vewy, vewy quiet. I'm hunting wabbits." Elmer then approaches one of Bugs' warrens, puts down a carrot, and hides behind a tree. Bugs' arm reaches out of the hole, feels around, and snatches the carrot. He reaches out again and finds Elmer's double-barreled shotgun. His arm quickly pops back into the hole before returning to drop the eaten stub of Elmer's carrot and apologetically caress the end of the barrel. Elmer shoves his gun into Bugs' burrow, and thus causes a struggle in which the barrel is bent into a bow.

Elmer frantically digs into the hole while Bugs emerges from a nearby opening with another carrot in his hand, lifts Fudd's hat, and taps the top of his head until Elmer notices; then chews his carrot and delivers his definitive line, "What's up, Doc?". When Elmer replies that "[he's] hunting 'wabbits'", Bugs chews his carrot and asks what a rabbit is; then teases Elmer by displaying every aspect of Fudd's description until Elmer suspects that Bugs is a rabbit. Bugs confirms this, hides behind a tree, sneaks behind Elmer, covers his eyes, and asks "Guess who?".

Elmer tries the names of contemporary screen beauties whose names exploited his speech impediment, before he guesses the rabbit. Bugs responds "Hmm.....  Could be!", kisses Elmer, and dives into his burrow. Elmer sticks his head into the hole and gets another kiss from Bugs; whereafter he wipes his mouth and decides to set a trap. When Bugs puts a skunk in the trap, Fudd blindly grabs the skunk and carries it over to the watching Bugs to brag; and when Elmer sees his mistake, Bugs gives him a kiss on the nose, where upon Fudd looks at the skunk, who winks and nudges Elmer. Fudd winces and gingerly sends the skunk on his way.

Bugs then offers a free shot at himself; fakes an elaborate death; and plays dead, leaving Elmer suffering with remorse; but survives the shot and sneaks up behind the distraught Fudd, kicks him in his rear, shoves a cigar into his mouth, and tiptoes away, ballet-style. Finally, the defeated Elmer walks away sobbing about "wabbits, cawwots, guns", etc. Bugs then remarks, "Can ya imagine anybody acting like that? Ya know, I think the poor guy's screwy", and begins to play his carrot like a fife, playing the tune The Girl I Left Behind Me, and marches with one stiff leg towards his rabbit hole (recalling The Spirit of '76).

Wild Hare on the radio
In a rare promotional broadcast, A Wild Hare was loosely adapted for the radio as a sketch performed by Mel Blanc and Arthur Q. Bryan on the April 11, 1941, edition of The Al Pearce Show.  The sketch was followed by a scripted interview with Leon Schlesinger.

What's up, Doc?
 Bob Clampett claimed that his inspiration for "creating" Bugs in the interview with Michael Barrier and Bugs Bunny Superstar that he was inspired by the film It Happened One Night, with Clark Gable's character chewing a carrot in a non-chalance stance while talking to Claudette Colbert's character about hitchhiking, however Avery denied this in the Avery-Jones letter, outright questioning it. However, this was the inspiration for the prototypical version that is seen in Porky's Hare Hunt, according to Friz Freleng. Also, Freleng also says that Gable's character wasn't the inspiration, but Roscoe Karns character, Oscar Shapeley, was the partial inspiration for the version created by Avery.
 The line, "What's up, Doc?", was added by director Tex Avery for this film. Avery explained later that it was a common expression in Texas where he was from, and he did not think much of the phrase. But when this short was screened in theaters, the scene of Bugs calmly chewing a carrot, followed by the nonchalant "What's Up, Doc?", went against any 1940s audience's expectation of how a rabbit might react to a hunter and caused complete pandemonium in the audience, bringing down the house in every theater. As a result of this popularity, Bugs eats a carrot and utters some version of the phrase in almost every one of his cartoons; sometimes entirely out of context.

Home media
"A Wild Hare" is available on many home video releases.
VHS - Bugs Bunny Collection: Here Comes Bugs (Blue Ribbon)
Laserdisc - The Golden Age of Looney Tunes, Volume 1 (Blue Ribbon title) and Volume 4, (Recreation Rings, same as Looney Tunes Golden Collection: Volume 3)
VHS - The Golden Age of Looney Tunes, Vol. 2: Firsts (Blue Ribbon)
DVD - Torrid Zone (Blue Ribbon, USA 1995 Turner print added as a bonus)
DVD - Looney Tunes Golden Collection: Volume 3, What's Up Doc? A Salute to Bugs Bunny documentary (unrestored, borrowed title card from "A Gander at Mother Goose" with edited production No., original titles)
DVD - Looney Tunes Golden Collection: Volume 4, through Bugs Bunny Superstar (same as Torrid Zone)
DVD - Warner Bros. Home Entertainment Academy Awards Animation Collection (restored)
DVD - The Essential Bugs Bunny (restored)
DVD - Bugs Bunny Superstar (USA 1995 Turner print added as a bonus)
Blu-ray, DVD - Looney Tunes Platinum Collection: Volume 2 (restored)
Blu-ray - Bugs Bunny 80th Anniversary Collection
Streaming  - HBO Max

Notes
The film was nominated for an Academy Award for Best Short Subject: Cartoons but lost to "The Milky Way", another MGM Rudolf Ising production.
When the film was reissued as a Blue Ribbon release, it was retitled The Wild Hare. Also, during the "guess who" sequence, the name Cawole Wombard was redubbed, since Lombard died in a plane crash, and was replaced by Bawbawa Stanwyck.

See also
 Looney Tunes and Merrie Melodies filmography (1940–1949)
 List of Bugs Bunny cartoons

References

External links

 
 

1940 short films
1940 films
1940 animated films
1940 comedy films
1940s animated short films
Films directed by Tex Avery
Bugs Bunny films
Films about hunters
Merrie Melodies short films
Films scored by Carl Stalling
Animated films about rabbits and hares
Films produced by Leon Schlesinger
1940s Warner Bros. animated short films
1940s English-language films